Le Réseau ACTION TI is a non-profit information technology professional association in Quebec, Canada.  Founded in 1977, the group was previously called the Fédération informatique du Québec and changed its name in autumn 2008.

As of 2019, ACTION TI has around 1,870 members divided into 
six sections: Estrie, Mauricie, Montréal, Québec, Saguenay-Lac-Saint-Jean, and Laval-Laurentides-Lanaudière.

Mission 

ACTION TI seeks to connect people in the information technology (IT) sectors 
of Québec, organizing events and helping promote excellence and improve knowledge and skills.

Accomplishments 

ACTION TI holds two annual conferences, the JIQ conference on trends in business and information technology, and the Datavore conference on data analysis and visualization.

The group awards the Prix Méritic, given to significant figures in the IT industry who can be viewed as role models.  Two prizes are given, one for upper management in IT and an individual career award.  In 2017, a third prize was added for the entrepreneur of a small/medium-sized business located in Quebec City.

The  has been held each year since 1987, aiming to recognise excellence in information technology in Québec by rewarding individuals, businesses, or organizations for their contributions to the industry. One winner of the categories is also chosen to win a special Excellence award.  
Trophies are awarded at ACTION TI's annual gala; winners are chosen by jury.

References

External links
 Réseau Action TI web site

Professional associations based in Quebec
Information technology organizations based in Canada